Henrik Schück (2 November 1855 – 3 October 1947)  was a Swedish literary historian, university professor and author.

Biography
Johan Henrik Emil Schück was a professor at the Lund University 1890–1898. He was a professor at Uppsala University from 1898 to 1920 and later Rector from 1905 to 1918. He was a member of the Swedish Academy 1913–1947, holding seat 3. He served as a member of the Nobel Committee of the academy from 1920 to 1936. He was Chairman of the Board of the Nobel Foundation 1918–1929. He was also a member of the Royal Swedish Academy of Letters, History and Antiquities and the Royal Swedish Academy of Sciences.

In 1880 Schück was one of the founders of the Swedish Literature Society in Uppsala. He developed a reputation as a foremost literary historical researchers. He worked on the development of historic literature studies  with university professor and librarian of the Nobel Library of the Swedish Academy, Karl Johan Warburg (1852-1918).  They jointed edited  Illustrerad svensk litteraturhistoria which covers Swedish literature for the period up to 1870. He also wrote a series of biographies of historic figures including  Engelbrekt Engelbrektsson, Olaus Petri, King Gustav III as well as William Shakespeare.

Selected works
William Schakspere, hans lif och verksamhet, (1883–84)
Skrifter i svensk litteraturhistoria, (1887)
Våra äldsta historiska folkvisor, (1891)
Lars Wivallius, hans lif och dikter, 2 vol., (1893–95)
 Allmän litteraturhistoria, (several versions)
 Bidrag till svensk bokhistoria, (1900)
 Engelbrekt (1915)
 Illustrerad svensk litteraturhistoria, three volumes; with Karl Warburg (1917–18)

References

Sources
 Johannesson, Hans-Erik  and Lars Lönnroth  (1990) Den Svenska Litteraturen VII   
This article is fully or partially based on material from Nordisk familjebok, Schück ,Johan Henrik Emil 1855-1947.

External links
Henrik Schück
LIBRIS - Nationella bibliotekssystem

1855 births
1947 deaths
Members of the Swedish Academy
Swedish literary historians
Uppsala University alumni
Rectors of Uppsala University
Academic staff of Lund University
Members of the Royal Swedish Academy of Sciences
Swedish people of Jewish descent
Burials at Uppsala old cemetery